The acronym NFB may refer to:

 National Federation of the Blind, organization representing blind people in the United States
 National Federation of Builders, trade association representing small and medium building contractors in the United Kingdom
 National Film Board of Canada, Canada's public film producer and distributor
 Negative feedback, process of feeding back to the input a part of a system's output, so as to reverse the direction of change of the output
 Network of Excellence for Functional Biomaterials, research centre based in Galway, Ireland
 Nouvelle Federation Board, non-fifa football representative organisation
 NF-κB, in molecular biology, often written as NF-B
 Neurofeedback, therapy technique that presents the user with realtime feedback on brainwave activity
 Noise from the Basement, debut album by Canadian singer Skye Sweetnam
 North Fork Bank, which was acquired by Capital One Bank in 2008